Nesopupa madgei is a species of very small, air-breathing land snail, a terrestrial pulmonate gastropod mollusks in the family Vertiginidae the whorl snails. This species is found in the islands of Mauritius and Réunion.

References

Vertiginidae
Gastropods described in 1936
Taxonomy articles created by Polbot
Taxa named by Alfred James Peile